At the 1952 Summer Olympics in Helsinki, the men's team modern pentathlon event was contested. It was the first appearance of the event. The team event used (modified) scores from the individual event.

Competition format
The modern pentathlon consisted of five events. The competition used a point-for-place system, with the lowest total across the five events winning. For the team competition, placing points in each of the five segments were adjusted to only account for full teams that finished that particular event. That is, when calculating placing points, individuals from countries that did not send full teams (1 each from Australia, Belgium, and South Africa) were ignored entirely. Places for members of the team from Germany (which had one individual not finish the shooting, swimming, and running events) were counted for the riding and fencing events but ignored for the shooting, swimming, and running events. 

 Riding: a show jumping competition. The course was 5000 m long, with a time limit of 10 minutes, 32 seconds. Riders started with 100 points and could lose points either through obstacle faults or going over the time limit. Negative scores were possible. Ties were broken by the specific time taken, with the quicker rider winning.
 Fencing: a round-robin, one-touch épée competition. Score was based on number of bouts won, with double-touches used as a tie-breaker.
 Shooting: a rapid fire pistol competition, with 20 shots (each scoring up to 10 points) per competitor.
 Swimming: a 300 m freestyle swimming competition.
 Running: a 4 km race.

Results

References

Modern pentathlon at the 1952 Summer Olympics